Ridge Township may refer to:

 Ridge Township, Shelby County, Illinois
 Ridge Township, Barber County, Kansas
 Ridge Township, Dickinson County, Kansas
 Ridge Township, Carroll County, Missouri
 Ridge Township, Van Wert County, Ohio
 Ridge Township, Wyandot County, Ohio

Township name disambiguation pages